A land mine is an explosive device activated by the victim.
Also used for an explosive charge in tunnel warfare.
Also used in the UK to describe a parachute mine during the Blitz.

Land mine may also refer to:
 Landmine (Transformers), several characters in the "Transformers" universe
 Landmine, the developer code name for Mozilla Firefox Version 3.0
 Landmine, an independent alternative rock band from Palo Alto, CA
 A woman of undesirable appearance, in spite of good physical health. Popularized by the show Jersey Shore.